College Green or The College Green may refer to:

 College Green, Adelaide outdoor venue at the University of Adelaide
 College Green, Bristol, England
 College Green (Dartmouth College), New Hampshire, primarily known as "the Green"
 College Green, Dublin, Ireland
 College Green Historic District, Iowa City, Iowa
 College Green, London, England
 College Green of Ohio University
 College Green (York), England
 Dublin College Green (UK Parliament constituency), Ireland